Zhemchuzhnikovite is an oxalate mineral of organic origin; formula  NaMg(FeAl)C2O4·8H2O. It forms smokey green crystals with a vitreous lustre and is found in Russian coal mines. It is named after Yury Zhemchuzhnikov (1885–1957), a Russian clay mineralogist.

See also
List of minerals named after people

References

Organic minerals
Oxalate minerals
Sodium minerals
Magnesium minerals
Aluminium minerals
Iron minerals
Trigonal minerals
Minerals described in 1963